Lawrence R. "Bubba" Cunningham (born May 12, 1962) is an American college athletics administrator. He was named athletic director for the University of North Carolina at Chapel Hill in 2011. He was previously athletic director for Ball State University from 2002 to 2005 and for the University of Tulsa from 2005 to 2011.

Early life and education
Lawrence R. Cunningham was born in Flint, Michigan, and was later raised in Naples, Florida. He attended the University of Notre Dame, playing golf there and getting his bachelor's and master's degrees in 1984 and 1988, respectively. Cunningham also began his career as an athletic director at Notre Dame, being their associate athletics director from 1995-2002.

Athletic Director

Ball State
Cunningham was for the first time made athletics director at Ball State in 2002. His biggest accomplishment at Ball State was a $12 million campaign to renovate their football stadium.

Tulsa
Cunningham accepted his second athletics director job at Tulsa in 2005. He was Tulsa's athletic director during their transition to Conference USA. While being the athletics director, Tulsa won 34 league championships in various sports, more than any other school in his tenure. He was honored as the 2008-09 FBS Central Region Athletics Director of the Year, an award given by the National Association of Collegiate Directors of Athletics.

North Carolina
On November 14, 2011, Cunningham accepted his current athletics director job at North Carolina. He has enjoyed a successful tenure as the athletics director, being awarded the 2019-20 AD of the Year Award from The National Association of Collegiate Directors of Athletics, and being appointed to various prestigious committees.

Personal life
Cunningham is married to Tina Cunningham, and they have four children.

References

External links
 North Carolina profile

Living people
Ball State Cardinals athletic directors
North Carolina Tar Heels athletic directors
Tulsa Golden Hurricane athletic directors
1962 births